The Reverend Noble Huston (died 1944), was  the minister of the First Presbyterian Church in Ballynahinch, County Down and a breeder of dogs, credited with saving the Irish Red and White Setter from extinction in the early the twentieth century. According to Anna Redlich in "The Dogs of Ireland" (Dundalgan Press 1949), he "mated his half red and half red and white bitch Gyp to Johnnie, and later on to Glen of Rossmore ... Thus in due time and by judicious selection , he managed to build up a kennel of Red and White Setters..."

In addition to his canine pursuits, the Rev. Huston kept bees.

References

External links
Irish Red and White Setter - Some History of the Breed

People from County Down
Dog breeders
Presbyterian ministers from Northern Ireland
Year of birth missing
1944 deaths